John F. Walter (born November 3, 1944) is a United States district judge of the United States District Court for the Central District of California.

Education and career

Born in Buffalo, New York, Walter received a Bachelor of Arts degree from Loyola University of Los Angeles in 1966 and a Juris Doctor from Loyola University of Los Angeles School of Law in 1969. He was in private practice in California from 1969 to 1970, and again from 1972 to 2002. He was an Assistant United States Attorney for the Central District of California from 1970 to 1972.

Federal judicial service

On January 23, 2002, Walter was nominated by President George W. Bush to a seat on the United States District Court for the Central District of California vacated by John Davies. Walter was confirmed by the United States Senate on April 25, 2002, and received his commission on May 1, 2002.

References

Sources

1944 births
Living people
Assistant United States Attorneys
Judges of the United States District Court for the Central District of California
Loyola Marymount University alumni
Lawyers from Buffalo, New York
United States district court judges appointed by George W. Bush
21st-century American judges